Astragalus subsecundus is a species of milkvetch in the family Fabaceae. It is native to Iran and Turkey.

References

subsecundus
Taxa named by Rudolph Friedrich Hohenacker
Taxa named by Pierre Edmond Boissier
Flora of Iran
Flora of Turkey